Michael Edward Curry (born August 22, 1968) is an American professional basketball coach and former player. He is currently an assistant coach for the Vanderbilt Commodores. Curry played in the National Basketball Association (NBA) from 1993 to 2005. He later served as head coach of the Detroit Pistons.

Playing career
A 6'5" guard/forward from Glenn Hills High School in Augusta, Georgia, and Georgia Southern University, Curry played eleven seasons (1993–1994 through 2004–2005) in the National Basketball Association as a member of the Philadelphia 76ers, the Washington Bullets, the Detroit Pistons, the Milwaukee Bucks, the Toronto Raptors and the Indiana Pacers.  Though he never averaged more than 6.6 points per game in a season, Curry was well respected throughout the league for his strong defense and leadership qualities, and for several years he served as president of the NBA Players Association.

In 1992, Curry was a guard/forward for the Long Island Surf of the United States Basketball League (USBL), averaging 20 points per game. As of the November 2000, he was one of 128 USBL players who had graduated to the NBA.

Internationally, Curry played in the German 1st basketball league for Steiner Bayreuth (1990–1991), in Italy for Clear Cantù (1994) and in the Spanish ACB for Valvi Girona (1994–1995).

NBA career statistics

Regular season

|-
| align="left" | 1993–94
| align="left" | Philadelphia
| 10 || 0 || 4.3 || .214 || .000 || .750 || 0.1 || 0.1 || 0.1 || 0.0 || 0.9
|-
| align="left" | 1995–96
| align="left" | Washington
| 5 || 0 || 6.8 || .300 || .000 || 1.000 || 1.0 || 0.2 || 0.2 || 0.0 || 2.0
|-
| align="left" | 1995–96
| align="left" | Detroit
| 41 || 1 || 18.3 || .464 || .400 || .707 || 2.0 || 0.6 || 0.6 || 0.0 || 4.9
|-
| align="left" | 1996–97
| align="left" | Detroit
| 81 || 2 || 15.0 || .448 || .299 || .898 || 1.5 || 0.5 || 0.4 || 0.1 || 3.9
|-
| align="left" | 1997–98
| align="left" | Milwaukee
| 82 || 27 || 24.1 || .469 || .444 || .835 || 1.2 || 1.7 || 0.7 || 0.2 || 6.6
|-
| align="left" | 1998–99
| align="left" | Milwaukee
| 50 || 4 || 22.9 || .437 || .067 || .797 || 2.2 || 1.6 || 0.8 || 0.1 || 4.9
|-
| align="left" | 1999–00
| align="left" | Detroit
| 82 || 3 || 19.6 || .480 || .200 || .839 || 1.3 || 1.1 || 0.4 || 0.1 || 6.2
|-
| align="left" | 2000–01
| align="left" | Detroit
| 68 || 58 || 21.8 || .455 || .444 || .849 || 1.8 || 1.9 || 0.4 || 0.0 || 5.2
|-
| align="left" | 2001–02
| align="left" | Detroit
| 82 || 75 || 23.3 || .453 || .269 || .791 || 2.0 || 1.5 || 0.6 || 0.1 || 4.0
|-
| align="left" | 2002–03
| align="left" | Detroit
| 78 || 77 || 19.9 || .402 || .296 || .800 || 1.6 || 1.3 || 0.6 || 0.1 || 3.0
|-
| align="left" | 2003–04
| align="left" | Toronto
| 70 || 15 || 17.6 || .388 || .200 || .845 || 1.2 || 0.8 || 0.3 || 0.1 || 2.9
|-
| align="left" | 2004–05
| align="left" | Indiana
| 18 || 7 || 13.8 || .448 || .000 || .500 || 1.5 || 0.8 || 0.3 || 0.2 || 1.7
|- class="sortbottom"
| style="text-align:center;" colspan="2"| Career
| 667 || 269 || 19.8 || .447 || .298 || .825 || 1.6 || 1.2 || 0.5 || 0.1 || 4.5
|}

Playoffs

|-
| align="left" | 1995–96
| align="left" | Detroit
| 3 || 0 || 14.3 || .429 || .000 || .000 || 1.0 || 0.3 || 0.3 || 0.3 || 2.0
|-
| align="left" | 1996–97
| align="left" | Detroit
| 2 || 0 || 3.5 || .500 || .000 || .000 || 0.5 || 0.0 || 0.0 || 0.0 || 1.0
|-
| align="left" | 1998–99
| align="left" | Milwaukee
| 3 || 0 || 19.7 || .583 || .000 || 1.000 || 1.3 || 1.0 || 0.7 || 0.3 || 6.7
|-
| align="left" | 1999–00
| align="left" | Detroit
| 3 || 1 || 26.3 || .522 || .000 || .667 || 1.0 || 1.0 || 0.3 || 0.3 || 9.3
|-
| align="left" | 2001–02
| align="left" | Detroit
| 10 || 10 || 22.1 || .564 || .385 || .727 || 1.4 || 1.2 || 0.4 || 0.0 || 5.7
|-
| align="left" | 2002–03
| align="left" | Detroit
| 15 || 14 || 18.3 || .364 || .333 || .857 || 1.1 || 1.1 || 0.5 || 0.1 || 2.7
|- class="sortbottom"
| style="text-align:center;" colspan="2"| Career
| 36 || 25 || 19.0 || .480 || .333 || .774 || 1.1 || 1.0 || 0.4 || 0.1 || 4.3
|}

Coaching career
On June 10, 2008 Curry was named as the head coach of the Detroit Pistons for the 2008–09 season, succeeding Flip Saunders. He received a three-year deal, worth $2.5 million per season.  On June 30, 2009, Curry was fired as head coach.  Prior to becoming head coach of the Pistons, Curry served as an assistant coach for Detroit and also as the NBA's Vice-President of Player Development.

Curry later worked as the associate head coach for the Philadelphia 76ers.

On April 7, 2014, Curry accepted a job at Florida Atlantic University, replacing Mike Jarvis. In four seasons, the Owls were 39–84 under Curry, who was fired from FAU on March 16, 2018 and replaced by Dusty May.

Head coaching record

NBA

|-
| align="left"|Detroit
| align="left"|
| 82 || 39 || 43 ||  || align="center"|3rd in Central || 4 || 0 || 4 || 
| align="center"|Lost in First Round
|-class="sortbottom"
| colspan="2" align="center"|Career
| 82 || 39 || 43 ||  || || 4 || 0 || 4 ||  ||

College

Personal life
His son, Deon Curry, played football as a wide receiver for Michigan State University.
Contrary to popular belief, he is not related to Dell Curry and Steph Curry.

References

External links
 Career statistics
NBA bio

1968 births
Living people
American expatriate basketball people in Canada
American expatriate basketball people in Germany
American expatriate basketball people in Italy
American expatriate basketball people in Spain
American men's basketball players
Basketball coaches from Georgia (U.S. state)
Basketball players from Augusta, Georgia
Capital Region Pontiacs players
CB Girona players
College men's basketball head coaches in the United States
Detroit Pistons assistant coaches
Detroit Pistons head coaches
Detroit Pistons players
Florida Atlantic Owls men's basketball coaches
Georgia Southern Eagles men's basketball players
Indiana Pacers players
Liga ACB players
Milwaukee Bucks players
National Basketball Players Association presidents
Omaha Racers players
Pallacanestro Cantù players
Philadelphia 76ers assistant coaches
Philadelphia 76ers players
Shooting guards
Small forwards
Sportspeople from Anniston, Alabama
Toronto Raptors players
Undrafted National Basketball Association players
Vanderbilt Commodores men's basketball coaches
Washington Bullets players